HaBonim (The Builders) is a moshav shitufi in northern Israel. Located 5 km south of Atlit and 3 km north of Kibbutz Nahsholim, it falls under the jurisdiction of Hof HaCarmel Regional Council.

History

The moshav was founded in 1949 by the HaBonim movement on land that had belonged to the depopulated Arab village of Kafr Lam. The first residents were from the United Kingdom and South Africa. It came to national prominence on 11 June 1985 due to the HaBonim disaster, in which a bus and train collided, killing 22 people, of which 19 were schoolchildren. A monument was erected at the train crossing.

Landmarks

Located in the eastern part of the moshav grounds is the ruined medieval fortress of Cafarlet, sometimes referred to as HaBonim Fortress.

Economy
Agrekal Habonim Industries, a manufacturer of Vermiculite and Perlite, was established in 1950 based on unique technology brought to Israel by the founders of the moshav from South Africa.

References

External links

Cafarlet Fortress on Gemsinisrael.com

Moshavim
Kibbutz Movement
Populated places established in 1949
Populated places in Haifa District
1949 establishments in Israel
British-Jewish culture in Israel
South African-Jewish culture in Israel